is a Japanese singer-songwriter and composer. He graduated from Okayama Prefectural Kurashiki Amagi High School and Nihon University College of Economics.

In 2017, Nakanishi participated as a guest artist at the annual touring ice show Fantasy on Ice in Makuhari. He performed in the show opening to the song "" amongst others.

Discography

Singles

Original albums

Best Albums/Compilations

Other participation works

Videos & laser discs

VSD (video single discs)

Music provisions

Filmography

NHK Kōhaku Uta Gassen appearances

Music videos

Main live performances

References

Notes

External links
 

Japanese male rock singers
Japanese male pop singers
1964 births
Living people
Japanese male composers
People from Okayama
Nihon University alumni
Universal Music Japan artists
Fantasy on Ice guest artists